Abraxas capitata is a species of moth belonging to the family Geometridae. It was described by Warren in 1894. It is known from India (including Himachal Pradesh).

References

Abraxini
Moths of Asia
Moths described in 1894